Zufer Avdija (born October 1, 1959) is a Serbian–Israeli professional basketball coach and former player who is the general manager and president of basketball operations for Bnei Herzliya of the Israeli Basketball Premier League. He played for Crvena zvezda in the Yugoslav Basketball League during the 1980s, and for Israeli clubs Ramat HaSharon, Rishon LeZion, Hapoel Tel Aviv, and Elitzur Bat Yam in the 1990s. He represented the Yugoslavia basketball team internationally. His son, Deni, is a current NBA player for the Washington Wizards.

Early and personal life
Avdija was born in Priština, SAP Kosovo, PR Serbia, FPR Yugoslavia (present-day Pristina, Kosovo). He is of ethnic Gorani-Muslim  descent (from Gora in southern Kosovo). When he was 15 he briefly played football as a goalkeeper for Ramiz Sadiku youth team in Pristina. He married and had 2 children, a daughter Iva and a son, Andrej.

He later married Sharon Artzi, an Israeli Jew from kibbutz Beit Zera, who is a former track and field athlete and basketball player. Their Israeli-born son, Deni Avdija (born 2001), is also a professional basketball player. Deni has been drafted as the 9th overall pick by the Washington Wizards in the 2020 NBA draft. Their son Deni also represents the Israel national team internationally.

Club career
A power forward, Avdija started his basketball career with his hometown team Elektrokosovo. In 1979, he joined the Belgrade-based team Crvena zvezda of the Yugoslav Basketball League, where he played during the 1980s. He was a team captain.

In the 1990s, Avdija played for Israeli clubs: Ramat HaSharon, Hapoel Herzliya, Rishon LeZion, Hapoel Tel Aviv, and Elitzur Bat Yam.

International career 
Avdija was a member of the Yugoslavia national team that won the bronze medal at the 1982 FIBA World Championship in Colombia, alongside teammates from Crvena zvezda, Rajko Žižić and Zoran Radović. He scored his tournament-high with 24 points in a 101–77 win over Uruguay. Over four tournament games, he averaged 8.8 points per game.

Also, Avdija won the gold medal at the 1983 Mediterranean Games in Morocco. He played 50 games for the national team.

See also 
 List of KK Crvena zvezda players with 100 games played
Sports in Israel
Basketball in Israel

References

1959 births
Living people
Bnei Hertzeliya basketball players
1982 FIBA World Championship players
Competitors at the 1983 Mediterranean Games
Hapoel Tel Aviv B.C. players
KB Prishtina players
KK Crvena zvezda players
Maccabi Rishon LeZion basketball players
Mediterranean Games gold medalists for Yugoslavia
Mediterranean Games medalists in basketball
Power forwards (basketball)
Serbian basketball executives and administrators
Serbian emigrants to Israel
Serbian men's basketball players
Serbian expatriate basketball people in Croatia
Serbian expatriate basketball people in Israel
Sportspeople from Pristina
Yugoslav emigrants to Israel
Yugoslav expatriate sportspeople in Israel
Yugoslav men's basketball players
Naturalized citizens of Israel
Israeli people of Kosovan descent
Serbian people of Kosovan descent
Israeli people of Serbian descent
Gorani people
Israeli Muslims